Royal Air Force Manby or more simply RAF Manby is a former Royal Air Force station located in Lincolnshire, England

The following units were here at some point:
 No. 1 Air Armament School (1937–1944) absorbed by the Empire Air Armament School (1944–1949) absorbed by the RAF Flying College (1949–1962) absorbed by the RAF College of Air Warfare (1962–1974)
 No. 25 (Flying Training) Group RAF
 No. 25 Group Communication Flight RAF (Reformed 1951–1961)
 No. 2782 Squadron RAF Regiment
 Armament Synthetic Development Unit
 School of Refresher Flying (1962–1973)

References

Citations

Bibliography

Manby